The Church of St Oswald, Lythe, is the parish church for the village of Lythe,  west, north west of Whitby in North Yorkshire, England. The church is at the top of Lythe Bank (the western end) and is just east of the village on the A174 road.

A church has been on the site since the 13th century, though the present building was adapted from the old church in 1910 by Sir Walter Tapper. It was grade I listed in 1969.

History
A church had been located on the site since the 13th century, but stones found in the early 20th century mark Lythe as being an important Viking burial ground. The tower of the old church was renovated in 1769, with the whole church being renovated in 1819. When Sir Walter Tapper rebuilt the church in 1910, only the north wall and the east end of the chancel were left untouched. During the rebuilding in the early 20th century, stones found in the walls of the tower were dated to pre-conquest times. Tapper also adapted the Norman tower to fit a spire, which acts as a way marker and coast marker for sailors travelling alongside the dangerous part of the coast near to here.

The church was granted to the monks of Nostell Priory during the period of Alexander III being pope (1159–1181) and so was named after their dedication of St Oswald. The church became crown property in the 1530s after its benefactor, Sir Francis Bigod was hanged at the Tyburn for high treason.

Before Tapper's restoration, several changes were made to the building which was essentially of 12th and 13th century origin. At some point, the walls were re-inforced with buttresses and two arches inside the church were demolished to make just one arch. The top of the tower was removed  "for fear of it falling down upon the church." In 1818, the roof was stripped of its lead covering and replaced with slate. The churchyard was enlarged in 1887 and around the same period, a lych-gate was added.

Its prominent location overlooking road and sea is often described as being in a commanding position for its views to the east. The chapel-of-ease of St Mary's at Sandsend, is believed to have been built when the population of Sandsend increased. The new church meant that worshippers could avoid the steep Lythe Bank to get up to St Oswald's.

Despite being described as having no antiquarian value by some writers (on account of its restoration in 1910) the building was given a grade I listing in 1969.

The roof was replaced again in 2018, when the roof tiles put up by Tapper were replaced with newer stones. The old sandstone tiles were carved into unique artworks by a local sculptor who then sold the pieces during the 2019 Tour de Yorkshire to raise money for the church.

Churchyard
The churchyard contains many graves, some dating as far back as the 10th century. Several of the burial plots are those from the Phipps family; the Phipps' are the family that have been in possession of Mulgrave Castle and woods for several centuries. Oswald Phipps, 4th Marquess of Normanby was buried here in 1994.

The churchyard also contains a memorial to the seventeen men from the village killed in the First World War and also commemorates seven unknown sailors who were washed ashore in the same period. The memorial sits to the south west of the church and is grade II listed.

In 1932, the Belgian trawler Jeanne was wrecked on the coast below Lythe. The graveyard contains a grave with three of the dead sailors.

Parish and benefice region
The parish consists of the settlements of Lythe, Sandsend, Goldsborough, East & West Barnby and Kettleness and the area largely consists of a rural seaside landscape. The church is part of the benefice of Hinderwell, Roxby & Staithes with Lythe, Ugthorpe & Sandsend.

The benefice has a population of 2,700 but only 74 attend church, and of those, only 20 attend St Oswald's regularly. In 2016, St Oswald's performed three baptisms, nine weddings and seven funerals.

In popular culture
The graveyard and church were used as a setting in the Daniel Day-Lewis film, "Phantom Thread".

Clergy
The following are listed as being rectors of St Oswalds between 1154 and 1537, when Edward Layton was presented as the vicar of St Oswalds by Henry VIII. Thereafter, all clergy are listed as vicars. Some sources list John Fisher, who was incumbent between 1499 and 1504 as being the Catholic Martyr of John Fisher and his recorder being Hugo Ashton, who succeeded him at Lythe.

References

Sources

External links

St Oswalds, Lythe webpage

Grade I listed churches in North Yorkshire
Church of England church buildings in North Yorkshire
12th-century church buildings in England